Transmetro, officially, Sistema Integrado de Transporte Masivo de Barranquilla y su Área Metropolitana (Spanish for: Mass Transit Integrated System of Barranquilla and its Metropolitan Area), is a mass transit system that has operated in the city of Barranquilla, Colombia since April 7, 2010.

External links
 Official Transmetro website
 Transmetro on Facebook
 Transmetro on Twitter

Barranquilla
Transport systems
Transport in Colombia